Negativicoccus massiliensis is a bacterium from the genus of Negativicoccus which has been isolated from human faeces.

References

 

Negativicutes
Bacteria described in 2016